Aeonium glandulosum is a species of subshrub of the family Crassulaceae endemic to the Madeira archipelago (Madeira Island, Porto Santo Island and Desertas Islands).

Description
It is a biennial or perennial glandular-pubescent sub-shrub with a very short stem, hidden by the leaves, occasionally stoloniferous. It has rosette shaped leaves, flat and plate-like but becomes centrally dome-shaped when the flowering season approaches,  in diameter. It has loose inflorescences,  with  pedicels that become distally curved.

Distribution

References

glandulosum
Endemic flora of Madeira